O Escaravelho do Diabo (The Devil's Scarab, in English) is a Brazilian young mystery novel, written by Lúcia Machado de Almeida. The story is centered on Alberto, a medical student who, upon seeing his brother killed after receiving a mysterious pack with a beetle inside, decides to investigate. Originally published in chapters in the magazine O Cruzeiro, between October 10 and December 26, 1953, O Escaravelho do Diabo achieved greater success by being republished in book in 1974 by Editora Ática, in the Série Vaga-Lume (a youth literature series), created in January of the previous year, with illustrations of Mario Cafiero. The book as repinted for twenty-six editions.O Escaravelho do Diabo was selected for the National Program of Library of the School, in 1999, and received a film adaptation in 2016.

Plot
The story takes place in Vista Alegre, a small city in the interior of São Paulo. It begins when the character Hugo, brother of Alberto, receives a mysterious package with a scarab (black beetle) inside. However, he is not interested in the origin of the gift, because he thinks it is a trick of his friends. The next day, Hugo is found dead with a sword nailed to his chest. Undeterred by the death of his brother, Alberto goes after the killer.

Returning home, he noticed, in a magazine, a beetle similar to what Hugo had received, the name was Phanaeus ensifer, which means "sword bearer." Then, he begins to delve into ancient objects in order to find the killer and prevent the next crime. After some time of searching, he found an [antiquarian] who sold the same sword, but the shopkeeper said he did not remember who had bought it.

From there, Alberto comes to the aid of the renowned local inspector, Inspector Pimentel and the deputy inspector Silva. They realize that all the victims of this killer, which happens to be denominated "Insect", have something in common: they are all legitimate redheads, with hair that remember the color of the fire and freckles. Together, they are investigating a series of crimes that follow, trying to find out also the reason for Hugo's murder. In the course of the investigation, Alberto meets and falls in love with Veronica, a beautiful orphan girl who lives in the house of an Irishwoman named Cora O'Shea, along with other residents, and this hampers the investigation.

The three men responsible for investigating the beetle case are becoming suspicious that the mystery solution is in Cora O'Shea's pension, but they can not get enough evidence and the case ends up being filed as "unresolved." After years, on a trip to  Europe, Alberto still thinks about regaining Veronica, and by chance, discovers who was the assassin of Hugo, and the reason of all this. ... the redheads still die.

Characters
Main
 Alberto: one of the crime solvers, Hugo's brother, in love with Veronica
 Inspector Pimentel: Inspector who takes care of the case of Hugo and the other victims
 Cora O'Shea: Irish pensioner and mother of Clarence O'Shea, she was 50 and a little deaf
 Mr.Gedeon: American, guest of Cora O'Shea
 Deputy Inspector Silva: Assistant to Inspector Pimentel and Alberto, is another main character.
 Elza: Cora O'Shea's pensioner and one of the suspects of crime
 Beetle.
 Veronica was in love with Alberto, and was an accused of the crimes.

Victims
 Hugo "Foguinho": First victim, murdered with a Spanish sword stuck in the chest, Alberto's brother;
 Clarence O'Shea: Son of Cora O'Shea, dies poisoned by a cyanide capsule placed in the middle of his remedies;
 Rubi: Lyric singer; dies in the middle of a performance of Bizet's "Carmen", struck by a poisoned arrow;
 Galo-da-Serra: Endangered animal; is strangled to death, and has all his feathers of fire torn out;
 Father Afonso: Father of the parish, he died carbonized;
 Mr. Graz: He died carbonized next to Father Afonso, during the fire in the chapel.

References

1974 novels
Brazilian science fiction novels
Brazilian mystery novels
Young adult novels